Marilyn Krysl (born 1942) is an American writer of short stories and poetry who is known for her quirky and witty storytelling. She has published four short story collections along with seven collections of poetry.  She has won several awards for her work, including the 2008 Richard Sullivan Prize for short fiction for her collection of short stories, Dinner With Osama, which is a sociopolitical satire of post-9/11 America. Krysl also submits work to The Atlantic journal, The Nation journal, and The New Republic journal, as well as being an editor of Many Mountains Moving: A Literary Journal of Diverse, Contemporary Voices along with Naomi Horii.

Biography

Marilyn Krysl, as a senior in high school, won the 1960 Oregon Award for Creativity. She entered the University of Oregon on a full tuition scholarship, courtesy of the award, in 1961. As an undergraduate she won the Alicia Woods Poetry Award, Julia Burgess Poetry Award, Peter Pauper Press Essay Prize, and the Ernest Haycox Short Story Prize.

She graduated in 1964, completed her MFA at University of Oregon in 1968, and in 1972 accepted a faculty position in the Dept of English at University of Colorado, Boulder. She later served in the Department as Director of Creative Writing.

At the invitation of Naomi Horii, Horii and Krysl co-edited and launched the literary journal Many Mountains Moving.

Awards and recognition
1960		Oregon Award for Creativity, University of Oregon full tuition scholarship
1961		Alicia Woods Poetry Award, University of Oregon
1961		Julia Burgess Poetry Award, University of Oregon
1961		Peter Pauper Press Essay Prize
1964		Ernest Haycox Short Story Prize, University of Oregon
1971		Harlan Ellison Speculative Fiction Fellowship, Writers Conference, University of Colorado
1974		National Endowment for the Arts Fellowship
1977-78	Faculty Fellowship, University of Colorado
1979		Utah State Arts Council Traveling Poetry Exhibition
1980		Finalist, San Francisco State Poetry Center Book Prize
1981		John O’Hara Journal Fiction Prize for Mozart, Westmoreland and Me
1981		Oasis Prize, Poetry Society of Georgia, for “The Unicorn.”
1984		Kansas Quarterly Poetry Prize, for “The Beautiful Alive Alone Illusion”
1985		YADDO Fellowship
1986		Arts and Humanities Book Award, University of Colorado
1986-87	Artist in Residence and Artist’s Commission, Center for Human Caring,
Health Sciences Center, University of Colorado
1989		Performing Arts Grant, Boulder Arts Commission
1989		President’s Fund for the Humanities Grant, University of Colorado
1990		Mountains and Plains Booksellers’ Assoc. Award for Poetry 
for What We Have To Live With
1991-92	Faculty Fellowship, University of Colorado
1993		Negative Capability Award for Fiction
1995		Spoon River Poetry Review Poetry Prize
1996		Cleveland State Poetry Center Book Prize and publication 
1997		American Council of Learned Societies Contemplative Fellowship
		in conjunction with Marcia Westkott of Women Studies
2000-2001	National Endowment for the Arts Fellowship
2001		Lawrence Foundation Prize for Fiction, from Prairie Schooner
2002		Essay Prize, from Prairie Schooner
2003		Geraldine McLoud Commendation for Fiction, from Nimrod 
2005                YADDO fellowship
2007		Notre Dame’s Richard Sullivan Prize for Dinner with Osama
2008	ForeWord Magazine’s Short Story Book of the Year Bronze Award for Dinner With Osama

References

American women short story writers
American short story writers
American women poets
1942 births
Living people
21st-century American women